Steffen Gebhardt (born 22 July 1981) is a German modern pentathlete. He competed at the 2004, 2008 and 2012 Summer Olympics.

References

External links
 

1981 births
Living people
German male modern pentathletes
Olympic modern pentathletes of Germany
Modern pentathletes at the 2004 Summer Olympics
Modern pentathletes at the 2008 Summer Olympics
Modern pentathletes at the 2012 Summer Olympics
Sportspeople from Neuss
World Modern Pentathlon Championships medalists
21st-century German people